This list of Nova Southeastern University alumni includes notable graduate and non-graduate former students of Nova Southeastern University.

Government

Executive

Isabel Saint Malo, Vice President of Panama

Judiciary 
Sheri Polster Chappell, Judge for the District Court for Middle District.
Victoria Sigler, Circuit Judge for the State of Florida, 11th Circuit.

Law enforcement

Gregory Tony (born 1978), Sheriff of Broward County, Florida

Legislature 
James Bush III, Florida State Representative 106th District, Miami, Florida
Carmine DeSopo (born 1940), member of the New Jersey General Assembly.
Martin David Kiar, Florida State Representative 97th District, Davie, Florida.
Jared Moskowitz, Vice Mayor, Parkland, Florida,US House of Representatives.
Ari Porth, Florida State Representative 96th District, Coral Springs, Florida.
Nick Thompson, Florida State Representative 73rd District, Fort Myers, Florida.
Jim Waldman, Florida State Representative 95th District, Coconut Creek, Florida.

Academia
Joe W. Aguillard, president of Louisiana College in Pineville, Louisiana since 2005 
Carole Ward Allen, former Professor and Administrator, Laney College
Helen Rose Dawson, academic dean and vice president of Villa Julie College (1965 to 1999)
 Arcadia Hernández López, educator and bilingual instruction innovator earned her doctorate at Nova.

Athletics

 Michael Fiers, pitcher in Major League Baseball (MLB) who has thrown two no-hitters
 J. D. Martinez, MLB All-Star right fielder and 2018 World Series champion for the Boston Red Sox
 Miles Mikolas, MLB All-Star pitcher for the St Louis Cardinals and formerly for the Yomiuri Giants in Nippon Professional Baseball (NPB)
 Esau Simpson, Grenadian swimmer in the 2012 Summer Olympics
Shelley Solomon (1963–2014), professional tennis player
Tim Coenraad, professional basketball player for the Illawarra Hawks in National Basketball League (NBL)

Entertainment
 Somy Ali, former Bollywood actress, writer, model, filmmaker, and activist
Dr. Will Kirby, celebrity dermatologist, winner of Big Brother and star of Dr. 90210.
Jillian Wunderlich, Miss Florida Teen USA 2008 and Miss Teen USA 2008 (Top 15), Miss Indiana USA 2011 and Miss USA 2011 (Top 16)

Law
Yale Galanter (born 1956), lawyer and legal commentator

Military
Leroy Gilbert, Chaplain of the U.S. Coast Guard

 Michelle Fraley Retired U.S. Army Col.

Other 
Louis Sola, Commissioner, Federal Maritime Commission
 Scott W. Rothstein, mastermind behind $1.2 billion Ponzi scheme

References